Charbagh is a town in the Khyber Pakhtunkhwa Province of Pakistan. It is part of Swabi District and is located at 34°10'30N 72°24'40E with an altitude of 352 metres (1158 feet).

References

Populated places in Swabi District